Ákos Kara (born May 21, 1975) is a Hungarian politician, member of the National Assembly (MP) for Győr (Győr-Moson-Sopron County Constituency I then II) since 2010. He served as Vice President of the General Assembly of Győr-Moson-Sopron County from 2011 to 2014. Formerly he held that position between 2006 and 2010.

Kara was the Deputy Chairman of the Committee on Employment and Labour since May 14, 2010. He was also a member of the Committee on Audit Office and Budget since May 9, 2011. He was appointed Secretary of State for Infocommunication and Consumer Protection on October 16, 2014.

Personal life
He is married and has two children.

References

1975 births
Living people
Fidesz politicians
Members of the National Assembly of Hungary (2010–2014)
Members of the National Assembly of Hungary (2014–2018)
Members of the National Assembly of Hungary (2018–2022)
Members of the National Assembly of Hungary (2022–2026)
People from Győr